Stuart Heydinger (5 May 1927 – 6 October 2019) was a British photojournalist and portrait photographer. He was chief photographer at The Observer from 1960 to 1966.

Life and work
Heydinger was born in Kingston upon Thames, south west London.

In 1960 he joined The Observer as chief photographer until he quit in 1966. He freelanced until 1968. In the early 1970s he travelled in the Basque country, drawing, painting and photographing people. In 1979 he moved to Germany where he worked taking photographs for theatres and made landscape photographs.

Publications
Just a Moment ... Fotografien von Stuart Heydinger. Bremen, Germany: Schuenemann, 2007. .

Solo exhibitions
Just a Moment: Photographs by Stuart Heydinger, Kingston Museum, Kingston upon Thames, 2008/2009

Collections
National Portrait Gallery, London: 1 print (as of November 2019)

References

External links
"The photojournalism of Stuart Heydinger", a gallery of photographs at The Guardian

The Observer photojournalists
Photographers from London
20th-century British photographers
People from Kingston upon Thames
2019 deaths
1927 births
British portrait photographers